The finals and the qualifying heats of the Men's 4×200 metres Freestyle Relay event at the 1997 FINA Short Course World Championships were held on the second day of the competition, on Friday 18 April 1997 in Gothenburg, Sweden.

Finals

Qualifying heats

See also
1996 Men's Olympic Games 4x200m Freestyle Relay
1997 Men's European LC Championships 4x200m Freestyle Relay

References
 Results

R